History of Salem may refer to:

India
History of Salem, Tamil Nadu

USA
History of Salem, Indiana
History of Salem, Iowa
History of Salem, Kentucky
History of Salem, Massachusetts
History of Salem, Missouri
History of Salem, New Jersey
History of Salem, Ohio
History of Salem, Oregon
History of Salem, South Dakota
History of Salem, Utah
History of Salem, Virginia
History of Salem, West Virginia